Koki may refer to:

Places 
Koki, Comoros, a village on the island of Anjouan in the Comoros
Koki, Senegal, a town in the Louga region of Senegal
Koki, Estonia, village in Lümanda Parish, Saare County, Estonia
Koki, a suburb of Port Moresby, Papua New Guinea

Other uses 
Koki (kickboxer), Japanese kickboxer
Koki, a Cameroonian cuisine dish made with black-eyed peas and red palm oil
Japanese imperial year (皇紀 kōki)
Kōki (given name), a Japanese given name
KOKI-TV, a Fox affiliate in Tulsa, Oklahoma
Koki, a Spanish children's claymation series that appears as a segment on the American children's TV series Big Bag
Koki, a variety of the Doromu language of Papua New Guinea
Marker pen, called a koki in South Africa
Koki, one of the main characters in the PBS animated series Wild Kratts
Koki, a weekly Indonesian cooking tabloid, published from 2003 to 2020